Raglan may refer to the following communities in Ontario, Canada:

Raglan, Chatham-Kent, Ontario
Raglan, Durham Regional Municipality, Ontario